Stephen E. Henderson (October 13, 1925 – January 7, 1997) was a professor of African-American literature and culture. He is noted for providing the first formal interpretation of militant Black poetry, and, with Vincent Harding and William Strickland, for founding the Institute of the Black World in Atlanta, Georgia.

Biography
Henderson was born in Key West, Florida. He served two years in the U.S. Army towards the end of the Second World War, and then enrolled at Morehouse College in Atlanta, Georgia, where he earned a bachelor's degree in English and sociology with high honors in 1949. He went on to pursue graduate studies at the University of Wisconsin, being awarded a master's degree in English in 1950.

In 1950, he became a professor of English at Virginia Union University, which post he held until 1962, meanwhile obtaining a PhD in English and Art History (1959). In 1962 he took an appointment as chair of the English department at Morehouse, and from 1969 for two years was as a senior research fellow at the Institute for the Black World in Atlanta, before in 1971 taking on professorship at Howard University in Washington, D.C., teaching in the departments of English and African American Studies. He was director of the Institute for the Arts and the Humanities at Howard (1973–85), and also lectured in the US and abroad. His 1973 book Understanding the New Black Poetry: Black Speech and Black Music as Poetic Reference is regarded as a seminal work that has been "heralded as the first formalized articulation of a theoretical understanding of African-American poetry and sparked new debate and dialogue in the world of African-American literature."

Henderson retired in 1992 and died aged 71 at his home in Langley Park, Maryland, on January 7, 1997.

Further reading 
 E. Ethelbert Miller, "Stephen E. Henderson: Conversation with a Literary Critic", in Paul Logan (ed.), A Howard Reader, pp. 317–25. 
 Stephen E. Henderson, "'Survival Motion': a Study of the Black Writer in the Black Revolution in America", in Mercer Cook and Stephen E. Henderson (eds), The Militant Black Writer in Africa and the United States.
 CLA Journal, March 1973, pp. 390–91; June 1997, pp. 517–20.
 Jet, February 3, 1997, p. 18.
 The Journal of Negro History, 1969, pp. 298–300; Fall 2000, p. 319.
 Shaveda Scott, "Stephen Henderson", Howard Legends (September 22, 2016)
 "Stephen E. Henderson", Biography Resource Center (April 8, 2004).

References 

1925 births
1997 deaths
People from Key West, Florida
Military personnel from Florida
Writers from Florida
American literary theorists
Morehouse College alumni
University of Wisconsin–Madison College of Letters and Science alumni
Virginia Union University faculty
Morehouse College faculty
Howard University faculty
African-American academics
United States Army personnel of World War II
20th-century African-American people